Tănăsoaia is a commune located in Vrancea County, Romania. It is composed of ten villages: Călimăneasa, Costișa, Costișa de Sus, Covrag, Feldioara, Galbeni, Nănești, Tănăsoaia, Vladnicu de Jos and Vladnicu de Sus.

References

Communes in Vrancea County
Localities in Western Moldavia